Tomorrowland (also known as Project T in some regions and subtitled A World Beyond in some other regions) is a 2015 American science fiction film directed by Brad Bird, with a screenplay by Bird and Damon Lindelof, based on a story by Bird, Lindelof, and Jeff Jensen. It stars George Clooney, Hugh Laurie, Britt Robertson, Raffey Cassidy, Tim McGraw, Kathryn Hahn, and Keegan-Michael Key. In the film, a disillusioned genius inventor (Clooney) and a teenage science enthusiast (Robertson) embark to an intriguing alternate dimension known as "Tomorrowland," where their actions directly affect their own world.

Walt Disney Pictures originally announced the film in June 2011 under the working title 1952, and later retitled it to Tomorrowland, after the futuristic themed land found at Disney theme parks. In drafting their story, Bird and Lindelof took inspiration from the progressive cultural movements of the Space Age, as well as Walt Disney's optimistic philosophy of the future, notably his conceptual vision for the planned community known as EPCOT. Principal photography began in August 2013, with scenes shot at multiple locales in five countries.

Tomorrowland was released in conventional and IMAX formats by Walt Disney Studios Motion Pictures on May 22, 2015. Upon its release, the film received mixed reviews from critics, who praised its original premise, performances, action sequences, visual effects, and themes, but felt that it lacked focus on the titular world and criticized the screenplay. The film grossed $209 million and finished up being a commercial failure worldwide against a total production and marketing cost of $280 million, losing Disney $120–150 million, though these figures do not take into account revenue from home media, merchandising, and syndication.

Plot
In 1964, a young boy named Frank Walker attends the 1964 New York World's Fair to sell his prototype jet pack, but is rejected, as it does not work. Frank is approached by a young girl, Athena, who hands him an orange lapel pin with a blue "T" embossed on it, telling him to follow her onto Walt Disney's "It's a Small World" attraction at the Fair's Pepsi-Cola Pavilion. Frank obeys and sneaks onto the ride, where the pin is scanned by a laser, and he is transported to Tomorrowland, a futuristic cityscape, where advanced robots fix his jetpack, allowing him to fly and join the secretive world.

In the present day, optimistic teenager Casey Newton repeatedly sabotages the planned demolition of a NASA launch site in Florida. Her father, Eddie, is a NASA engineer, but faces losing his job. Casey is eventually caught and arrested. At the police station, she finds a pin in her belongings. While touching it, the pin transports her to Tomorrowland. Her adventure is cut short when the pin's battery runs out.

With help from her younger brother Nate, Casey finds a Houston memorabilia store related to the pin. The owners attack her when she is unable to divulge where she got the pin, insisting that Casey knows about a "little girl". Athena bursts in and defeats the owners, actually Audio-Animatronics, who self-destruct, blowing apart the shop. After Casey and Athena steal a car, Athena reveals she is an animatronic, purposed to find and recruit people who fit the ideals of Tomorrowland. Athena drops Casey off outside an adult Frank's house in Pittsfield, New York.

The reclusive, cynical Frank declines Casey's request to take her to Tomorrowland, having been banished from it years ago. Inside Frank's house, Casey finds a probability counter marking the end of the world. Frank warns her that the future is doomed, but she disagrees, thus lowering the counter's probability. Animatronic assassins arrive to kill Casey, but she and Frank escape, meeting Athena in the woods outside Frank's house. Frank resents Athena for lying to him about her true nature, but reluctantly agrees to help them get to Tomorrowland.

Using a teleportation device, the trio travel to the top of the Eiffel Tower. Frank explains that Gustave Eiffel, Jules Verne, Nikola Tesla, and Thomas Edison co-founded Plus Ultra, a secret society of futurists, creating Tomorrowland in another dimension, free to make scientific breakthroughs without obstruction, eventually inducting Walt Disney into the society based on his philosophy of "making dreams come true" through imagination and filmmaking aligning with their own principles, thus one of the first transports to Tommorowland was built beneath Disneyland's park attraction of the same name. The trio use an antique rocket, called the Spectacle, hidden beneath the Eiffel Tower to travel to Tomorrowland.

There, they find Tomorrowland in a state of decay. David Nix, Tomorrowland's governor, greets them. They travel to a tachyon machine, invented by Frank, which accurately predicted the worldwide catastrophe. Casey refuses to accept the world will end, causing the future to temporarily alter. While Frank attempts to convince David to listen, he refuses and intends to have the group leave Tomorrowland.

Casey realizes the tachyon machine is telling humanity that the world will end, creating a self-fulfilling prophecy. They confront David, who admits he tried to prevent the future by projecting such images to humanity as a warning. Instead, they embraced the apocalypse, refusing to act to make a better future for their world. Believing that humanity simply gave up, David has also given up and intends to allow the apocalypse to happen. Casey, Frank, and Athena attempt to use a bomb to destroy the machine, leading to a fight with David. The bomb is accidentally thrown through a portal to an uninhabited island on Earth, the explosion pinning David's leg. Athena sees a vision of the future where Frank is shot by David, and she jumps in the way of his attack, mortally wounding herself. Making peace with Frank, Athena activates her self-destruct sequence, destroying the machine, which falls on David, killing him.

In the present, Casey and Frank lead Tomorrowland, recruit Eddie and Nate, and create a new group of recruitment animatronics like Athena, whom they were addressing at the beginning of the film. Given pins, the animatronic children set out to recruit new dreamers and thinkers for Tomorrowland.

Cast

 George Clooney as John Francis "Frank" Walker, a grizzled inventor
 Thomas Robinson as Young Frank Walker
 Hugh Laurie as David Nix, leader of Tomorrowland
 Britt Robertson as Casey Newton, an optimistic and tech-savvy teenager
 Shiloh Nelson as Young Casey Newton
 Raffey Cassidy as Athena, an Audio-Animatronic droid recruiter 
 Tim McGraw as Eddie Newton, Casey's father and NASA engineer
 Kathryn Hahn as Ursula, store owner and one of Nix's assassins
 Keegan-Michael Key as Hugo Gernsback, store owner and another of Nix's assassins
 Chris Bauer as Mr. Walker, Frank's dad
 Pierce Gagnon as Nate Newton, Casey's brother
 Matthew Maccaull as Dave Clark
 Judy Greer as Jenny Newton, Casey's mother
 Garry Chalk as Jail Desk Jockey

Production

Development
In 2010, Damon Lindelof began discussions with Walt Disney Studios about producing a modern science-fiction Disney film, with Tomorrowland as a basis. The project was greenlit by Walt Disney Pictures' president of production, Sean Bailey in June 2011 with Lindelof signed on to write and produce a film with the working title of 1952. Lindelof asked Jeff Jensen — who had previously published material on Lindelof's Lost television series — if he was interested in contributing to story elements. Jensen agreed and began to research the history of the Walt Disney Company, particularly Walt Disney's fascination with futurism, scientific innovation and utopia, as well as his involvement with the 1964 New York World's Fair and Disney's unrealized concept for EPCOT. In May 2012, Brad Bird was hired as director. Bird's story ideas and themes were influenced by the fading of cultural optimism that once defined society in the 1950s, '60s, and early '70s, stating that, "When Damon and I were first talking about the project, we were wondering why people's once-bright notions about the future gradually seemed to disappear."

While keeping information about the plot secret, when asked in November 2012 whether the project would be Star Wars: Episode VII, Bird denied the rumor, but confirmed that Tomorrowland would be a science-fiction film, with Lindelof adding that the film would not center on extraterrestrials. Coincidentally, Bird had been tapped to direct Star Wars: Episode VII, but turned down the offer in order to work on Tomorrowland. Later that month, George Clooney entered negotiations to star in the film. In February 2013, Hugh Laurie joined the film. In July 2013, Britt Robertson was cast.

On January 23, 2013, nearly a week before the title change, Bird tweeted a picture related to the project. The image showed a frayed cardboard box labeled 1952, supposedly uncovered from the Walt Disney Imagineering developmental unit, and containing items like archival photographs of Walt Disney, Technicolor film, envelopes, a vinyl record, space technology literature, a 1928 copy of an Amazing Stories magazine (which introduced Philip Francis Nowlan's Buck Rogers character), and an unidentified metal object. On August 10, 2013, Bird and Lindelof gave a presentation at the D23 Expo in Anaheim, California, where they opened the "1952" box and revealed many of its contents. Later that day a pavilion was unveiled on the D23 Expo show floor which presented the items for close inspection by guests. There was also an accompanying iPhone app which took viewers through the exhibit much like one would experience at a museum. Michael Giacchino was hired to compose the film music.

Originally, the film included overt references to Walt Disney's involvement with Plus Ultra, the fictional organization founded by Gustave Eiffel, Jules Verne, Nikola Tesla, and Thomas Edison — including the idea that Disneyland's Tomorrowland was intended to be a cover-up for the real one developed by the group — however, the scenes and dialogue were omitted from the final cut of the film. Pixar Animation Studios created an animated short film, narrated by Maurice LaMarche, that explained the backstory of Plus Ultra, which was planned to be incorporated into an excised scene where a young Frank Walker is transported beneath the "It's a Small World" attraction, and through an informative series of displays, reminiscent of Disney dark rides.

Filming

Principal photography commenced in Enderby, British Columbia on August 8, 2013, and also filmed in Vancouver. In October, Kathryn Hahn was cast as a character named Ursula. That same month, it was announced that part of the filming would take place in the City of Arts and Sciences in Valencia. In November, scenes depicting the Newtons' hometown were shot at New Smyrna Beach, and the Carousel of Progress attraction at Walt Disney World in Florida. On February 3, 2014, additional filming took place at the It's a Small World attraction at Disneyland in California, and wrapped on February 6. The film's production designers incorporated the designs of Space Mountain and Spaceship Earth as architectural features of the Tomorrowland cityscape. Per a suggestion by Bird during production, the Walt Disney Pictures opening production logo features the Tomorrowland skyline instead of the studio's conventional fantasy castle. Industrial Light & Magic created the visual effects for Tomorrowland.

During post-production, a number of scenes featuring actress Judy Greer as Jenny Newton, Casey's (Robertson) late mother were cut in order to improve the film's runtime. Greer's role was reduced to minor cameo, while actor Lochlyn Munro, who portrayed Casey's live-in uncle Anthony, had his scenes removed completely.

Music
The musical score for Tomorrowland was composed by Michael Giacchino, a recurrent collaborator of Bird's. A soundtrack album was released digitally on May 19, 2015, followed by a physical release on June 2, 2015. Songs not included on the album, but featured in the film include "There's a Great Big Beautiful Tomorrow" and "It's a Small World (After All)," both written by Richard M. Sherman and Robert B. Sherman, and "I Got Mine" by The Black Keys.

Release

Alternate reality game
The Optimist, an alternate reality game, was created by Walt Disney Imagineering with Walt Disney Studios to create the world of Tomorrowland and to introduce the movie to the Disney theme park fanbase. It occurred in a fictionalized version of Disney history and players interacted with multiple characters that led them on a hunt across a variety of places with clues and puzzles leading to more. It ran from July 3, 2013, to August 11, 2013. It led players around the Anaheim area and within Disneyland itself and culminated at the D23 Expo.

Theatrical
Tomorrowland held its world premiere at the Disneyland Resort in Anaheim, California on May 9, 2015. The film was released on May 22, 2015, in theaters and IMAX, and was the first film to be released in Dolby Vision format in Dolby Cinema.

Despite owning the trademark to the word "Tomorrowland" in the United States since 1970, Disney released the film in the United Kingdom as Tomorrowland: A World Beyond, and as Project T in several European markets, including the Netherlands, Belgium, and Luxembourg, because ID&T had previously registered the trademark in 2005, for their electronic musical festival of the same name. In compliance to Disney's ownership of the trademark in the United States, ID&T renamed the American version of their music festival as TomorrowWorld.

Home media
Tomorrowland was released by Walt Disney Studios Home Entertainment on Blu-ray, DVD, and digital download on October 13, 2015. Upon its first week of release on home media in the U.S., the film debuted at number 3 at the Nielsen VideoScan First Alert chart, which tracks overall disc sales, and number 4 at the Blu-ray Disc sales chart with 47% of unit sales coming from Blu-ray.

Reception

Box office
Tomorrowland grossed $93.4 million in the United States and Canada, and $115.6 million in other territories, for a worldwide total of $209 million, against a production budget of $180–190 million. The Hollywood Reporter estimated that the film cost $280 million to produce and market, and noted that the financial losses by Disney finished anywhere between $120 and $150 million. According to them, Tomorrowland was the third original tent-pole film of 2015 to flop, following Jupiter Ascending and Seventh Son. Walt Disney Studios Motion Pictures distribution chief, Dave Hollis, commented on the film's debut performance, saying, "Tomorrowland is an original movie and that's more of a challenge in this marketplace. We feel it's incredibly important for us as a company and as an industry to keep telling original stories."

In the United States and Canada, Tomorrowland was released on May 22, 2015, from 3,970 theaters in its opening weekend. On its first three-day weekend, it earned $33 million, coming in at first place after a close race with Pitch Perfect 2 which grossed $30.8 million. During the four-day Memorial Day weekend, it earned $42.7 million — the lowest opening for a big-budget tentpole since Disney's Prince of Persia: The Sands of Time, which opened to $37.8 million in 2010. Considering the film's $190 million budget ($280–330 million, including marketing costs), many media outlets considered the film's opening in the U.S. and Canada a box office failure.

Critical response

  Audiences polled by CinemaScore gave the film an average grade of "B" on an A+ to F scale.

Peter Travers of Rolling Stone gave the film two and a half stars out of four, saying "Brad Bird's Tomorrowland, a noble failure about trying to succeed, is written and directed with such open-hearted optimism that you cheer it on even as it stumbles." Stephanie Merry of The Washington Post gave the film two out of four stars, saying "Maybe the ultimate goal of Tomorrowland remains obscure because once you know where the story is headed, you realize it's a familiar tale. The movie can conjure up futuristic images, but the story is nothing we haven't seen before." Moira MacDonald of The Seattle Times gave the film two and a half stars out of four, saying "Though it's made with great energy and inventiveness, there's something ultimately muddy about Tomorrowland; it's as if director Brad Bird got so caught up in the sets and effects and whooshing editing that the story somehow slipped away." Colin Covert of the Star Tribune gave the film two out of four stars, saying "A well-oiled machine of visuals, and yet a wobbling rattletrap of storytelling, the sci-fi fantasy Tomorrowland is an unwieldy clunker driven into the ditch at full speed." James Berardinelli of Reelviews.net gave the film two and a half stars out of four, saying "For a while, it doesn't matter that the plot meanders. The story seems like a jigsaw puzzle inviting us to solve it. That's the fun part. However, when the resolution is presented, it underwhelms." A. O. Scott of The New York Times gave the film a negative review, saying "It's important to note that Tomorrowland is not disappointing in the usual way. It's not another glib, phoned-in piece of franchise mediocrity, but rather a work of evident passion and conviction. What it isn't is in any way convincing or enchanting." 
Steven Rea of The Philadelphia Inquirer gave the film two and a half stars out of four, saying "Unlikely to be remembered in decades to come – or even in months to come, once the next teenage dystopian fantasy inserts itself into movie houses."

Ty Burr of The Boston Globe gave the film two and a half stars out of four, saying "Rapturous on a scene-by-scene basis and nearly incoherent when taken as a whole, the movie is idealistic and deranged, inspirational and very, very conflicted." Stephen Whitty of The Star-Ledger (Newark) gave the film one and a half stars out of four, saying "Strip Tomorrowland down to its essentials, and you get an ending out of "I'd like to teach the world to sing" and a moral which boils down to: Just be positive, OK? So OK. I'm positive Tomorrowland was a disappointment." David Edelstein of Vulture gave the film a positive review, stating that "Tomorrowland is the most enchanting reactionary cultural diatribe ever made. It's so smart, so winsome, so utterly rejuvenating that you'll have to wait until your eyes have dried and your buzz has worn off before you can begin to argue with it." Inkoo Kang of TheWrap also wrote a positive review, saying "Tomorrowland is a globe-trotting, time-traveling caper whose giddy visual whimsies and exuberant cartoon violence are undermined by a coy mystery that stretches as long as the line for "Space Mountain" on a hot summer day." Brian Truitt of USA Today gave the film three out of four stars, saying "A spectacular ride for most of it, and while you're a little let down at the end, you kind of want to jump back on and do it all over again."

Linda Barnard of the Toronto Star gave the film three out of four stars, saying "Brad Bird presents a gorgeously wrought, hopeful future vision in Tomorrowland, infusing the family film with enough entertaining action and retro-themed whiz bang to forgive an awkward opening and third-act weakness." A.A. Dowd of The A.V. Club gave the film a B−, saying "Bird stages the PG mayhem with his usual grasp of dimension and space, his gift for action that's timed like physical comedy. He keeps the whole thing moving, even when it begins to feel bogged down by preachiness and sci-fi exposition." Forrest Wickman, of Slate, said the film's "politics might be a little incoherent, or naïve. It is a kids' movie, after all." Anthony Perrotta of Entropy commented that the film was inspired by the beliefs of both Walt Disney and Ayn Rand, similarly to Andrew Ryan, the villain in BioShock who constructed Rapture, a city that resembles Tomorrowland in its secrecy and intention to encourage scientific development of idealists by isolating them from the rest of the world. Amy Nicholson of LA Weekly gave the film a B+, saying "Bird has made a film that every child should see. And if his $190 million dream flops, he'll be asking the same question as his movie: When did it become uncool to care?"

Accolades

References

External links

 
 
 
 
 

1964 New York World's Fair
2010s science fiction adventure films
2015 films
American chase films
American science fiction adventure films
Android (robot) films
Apocalyptic films
Films scored by Michael Giacchino
Films about NASA
Films about technological impact
Films directed by Brad Bird
Films produced by Damon Lindelof
Films set in 1964
Films set in 1965
Films set in 2003
Films set in 2015
Films set in Florida
Films set in Houston
Films set in New York City
Films set in Paris
Films shot in California
Films shot in Florida
Films shot in Paris
Films shot in Spain
Films shot in the Bahamas
Films shot in Vancouver
Films with screenplays by Brad Bird
IMAX films
Science fantasy films
Science fiction adventure films
Films with screenplays by Damon Lindelof
Tomorrowland
Utopian films
Walt Disney Pictures films
World's fairs in fiction
Films produced by Brad Bird
Fictional places in Disney films
Films set in the future
American children's fantasy films
American children's adventure films
2010s English-language films
2010s American films